The Songrim Line is a partially electrified standard-gauge secondary line of the Korean State Railway in South Hwanghae Province, North Korea, running from Hwangju on the P'yŏngbu Line to Songrim.

The line continues past Songrim Ch'ŏngnyŏn Station to the freight-only Songrim Hwamul Station and the Hwanghae Iron & Steel Complex.

History
Originally built by the Chosen Government Railway (Sentetsu) as the Kyŏmip'o Line (겸이포선, 兼二浦線), construction was completed in November 1905, and  revenue operations began on 1 April 1908. Changch'ŏlli Station was opened by Sentetsu on 5 December 1915. Originally built to serve the Mitsubishi Iron Foundry (called the Hwanghae Iron & Steel Complex since 1945), in 1920 there was one daily round-trip through train between P'yŏngyang and Kyŏmip'o, along with five daily round-trip local trains (second and third class only) between Hwangju and Kyŏmip'o.

After the defeat of Japan in the Pacific War and the subsequent partition of Korea, the entirety of the line, being north of the 38th parallel, was located in the Soviet zone of occupation; on 10 August 1946, the Provisional People's Committee for North Korea nationalised all railways within its jurisdiction, including the Songrim Line, and it has since been operated by the Korean State Railway.

Route

A yellow background in the "Distance" box indicates that section of the line is not electrified.

References
 Japanese Government Railways (1937), 鉄道停車場一覧. 昭和12年10月1日現在(The List of the Stations as of 1 October 1937), Kawaguchi Printing Company, Tokyo, pp. 486

Railway lines in North Korea
Standard gauge railways in North Korea